Curtis Kinnard Hairston (October 10, 1961 – January 18, 1996) was an American soul/funk vocalist, who had a number of top 75 hit singles in the UK and US, both as a solo artist and as a featured artist in the B. B. & Q. Band. Hairston's signature hit came in 1985, when he reached No. 13 in the UK Singles Chart with "I Want Your Lovin' (Just a Little Bit)".

A longtime sufferer of diabetes, Hairston died of related kidney failure at age 34 in Winston-Salem, North Carolina, in January 1996. He had attended both Winston-Salem State University and the Juilliard School of Music.

Career
Curtis Hairston had wanted a career in music since he was around 13. After completing his education at the Juilliard School of Music in 1980, he immediately started to search for record label contracts. It just so happened, that at the same time; old school friend Earl Monroe had formed a label called Pretty Pearl. Curtis got in contact, and eventually struck a contract deal with Earl.

His debut single in 1983 was "I Want You (All Tonight)". The track proved moderately successful peaking at No. 35 on the US Billboard Dance charts, and No. 44 in the UK Singles Chart. In 1984, he did a cover version of Jimmy Cliff's "We All Are One", which became his first Billboard R&B chart hit, reaching No. 72. Curtis had his first major hit in 1985 with "I Want Your Lovin' (Just a Little Bit)" which peaked at No. 13 on the UK Charts. The song's success led to an appearance on British music show Top of the Pops, and a music video was also made.

Curtis also provided lead vocals on the majority of tracks from the B. B. & Q. Band's 1985 LP Genie. The album proved successful in the UK, with the song "Dreamer" becoming a top 40 hit, however Curtis remained uncredited for this act.

In 1986, he left Pretty Pearl records and signed on to the much more mainstream label, Atlantic Records. The same year he released first and only studio album. One of the tracks "Chillin Out" got to No. 57 in the UK. Additionally, singer Luther Vandross provided backing vocals on some of the songs included with his debut album. Curtis released his last solo single "The Morning After" in 1987.

In 1990, Hairston collaborated with the jazz group Ready for Reality. Hairston passed away on January 18, 1996, at North Carolina Baptist Hospital. His funeral service took place two days later at the First Baptist Church in Winston-Salem.

In 2012, Reverse Spin Music released a greatest hits album entitled Celebrating Curtis Hairston. The compilation included some unreleased songs which he recorded before he died.

Discography

Studio album
 Curtis Hairston (1986)

Compilation album
 Celebrating Curtis Hairston (2012)

Singles

References

External links
 Album and singles discography at Discogs.

1961 births
1996 deaths
American funk singers
American soul singers
American male singer-songwriters
American rhythm and blues singer-songwriters
Singer-songwriters from North Carolina
Deaths from diabetes
Deaths from kidney failure
Musicians from Winston-Salem, North Carolina
20th-century American singers
20th-century American male singers